David Dimitri (born March 7, 1963) is an internationally acclaimed tightrope acrobat who has been praised for his unique style.

Combining an education at the State Academy for Circus Arts in Budapest with intensive dance studies at New York’s renowned Juilliard School, David Dimitri has created virtuoso wire dances celebrated at circuses, arts festivals, and concert halls throughout the world – Canada’s Cirque du Soleil, New York’s Big Apple Circus, Switzerland's Circus Knie, and the Metropolitan Opera under the direction of Jean-Pierre Ponnelle.

In 2001, Dimitri’s performing career took on an added dimension. With the assistance of his father, the famed clown and mime Dimitri, he created the one-man show "L'Homme Cirque" a presentation of nouveau cirque arts performed in a touring circus tent designed and built for the production.

David Dimitri has been a guest artist at such festivals as Spoleto Festival USA in Charleston, South Carolina; the Lincoln Center Festival New York; Juste pour rire, Jeux de piste, Strasbourg, and the Avignon Festival. He also performed on Broadway, at the New Victory Theater. He christened the new Commerzbank-Arena in Frankfurt with a high wire crossing in 2005. 
In 2011 David Dimitri was Performing 30 performances at the prestigious Theater Vidy Lausanne. 
The premiere of L'homme cirque in Italy, took place in Colorno, in 2012, at the Festival Tutti matti per Colorno.
In 2013, he toured his one-man show in the US at the Festival of Arts and Ideas and Canada at the Festival Montréal Complètement Cirque. In the winter 2013-14 he performed at the Winterfest in Salzburg, Austria.

References

External links
 More about David Dimitri
 More about David Dimitri's One-Man Circus

Living people
Tightrope walkers
1963 births